In mathematics, particularly in homological algebra and algebraic topology, the Eilenberg–Ganea theorem states for every finitely generated group G with certain conditions on its cohomological dimension (namely ), one can construct an aspherical CW complex X of dimension n whose fundamental group is G. The theorem is named after Polish mathematician Samuel Eilenberg and Romanian mathematician Tudor Ganea. The theorem was first published in a short paper in 1957 in the Annals of Mathematics.

Definitions
Group cohomology: Let  be a group and let  be the corresponding Eilenberg−MacLane space.

Fact: If  has a projective resolution of length at most , i.e.,  as trivial  module has a projective resolution of length at most  if and only if  for all -modules  and for all .

Therefore, we have an alternative definition of cohomological dimension as follows,

Eilenberg−Ganea theorem
Let  be a finitely presented group and  be an integer.

Converse
Converse of this theorem is an consequence of cellular homology, and the fact that every free module is projective.

Theorem: Let X be an aspherical n-dimensional CW complex with π1(X) = G, then cdZ(G) ≤ n.

Related results and conjectures
For n = 1 the result is one of the consequences of Stallings theorem about ends of groups.

Theorem: Every finitely generated group of cohomological dimension one is free.

For  the statement is  known as the Eilenberg–Ganea conjecture.

See also 
 Eilenberg–Ganea conjecture
 Group cohomology
 Cohomological dimension
 Stallings theorem about ends of groups

References 

.
Kenneth S. Brown, Cohomology of groups, Corrected reprint of the 1982 original, Graduate Texts in Mathematics, 87, Springer-Verlag, New York, 1994. .  

Homological algebra
Theorems in algebraic topology